First State is a trance act fronted by the Dutch record producer Sander van der Waal, also known as Sander van Dien, who has released three studio albums. Signed to Black Hole Recordings, they have performed internationally and work with vocalists such as Anita Kelsey, Neev Kennedy and Sarah Howells.

History
The duo made their debut in 2005 with a self-titled 12". It was originally a duo consisting of Ralph Barendse and Sander van der Waal, who is also known by his alias Sander van Dien. They released their first studio album, Time Frame in 2007. It features vocal contributions by Tiff Lacey, Anita Kelsey and Elliot Johns. It was supported by the single, "Falling" that was featured on the In Search Of Sunrise compilation. It was followed by "Sierra Nevada" and "Your Own Way". In 2008, the mixed compilation, In Trance We Trust with James Brook, was released in Australia. In January 2009, the duo released the single, "Off The Radar", although Barendse left the project in May of that year.

In 2010, van Dien released the second studio album, Changing Lanes, featuring vocal contributions by Sarah Howells, Kyler England and again Johns. The album was considered to be a stylistical change and explored other genres.

In late 2011, South African DJ and producer Shane Halcon joined the project. In February 2012, they released their first single together "Reloaded". At the end of 2012, Shane Halcon left the project to make a solo career. In March 2014, the third studio album, Full Circle, was released where van Dien again worked with Howells and England, as well as Tyler Sherritt, Neev Kennedy, Jaren Cerf and Quilla.

Besides using the name First State, van der Waal has also released under the name OneWorld and Devoid. A number of co-productions have appeared with his South African manager Shane Halcon.

Discography

Studio albums
 Time Frame (2007)
 Changing Lanes (2010)
 Full Circle (2014)

Compilation albums
 In Trance We Trust (2008)

Singles
 "First State / Sacred" (2005)
 "Falling"  (2007)
 "Your Own Way" (2008)
 "Sierra Nevada" (2008)
 "Off The Radar" (2009)
 "Brave"  (2009)
 "Cross the Line"  (2010)
 "As You Were" (2010)
 "Cape Point" (2010)
 "Reverie"  (2011)
 "Skies On Fire"  (2011)
 "Maze"  (2011)
 "Reloaded" (2012)
 "Holding On"  (2012)
 "Why So Serious"  (2012)
 "Seeing Stars"  (2013)
 "Humanoid" (2013)
 "Battle Of Hearts" 
 "Louders" (2013)
 "Take The Fall"  (2014)
 "Scube" (2014)
 "Get Low" (2014)
 "I'am You"  (2015)
 "Falling (The Remixes Part 1)"  (2015)
 "Falling (The Remixes Part 2)"  (2015)
 "Glow (Remixes)"  (2015)
 "Chimera"  (2016)
 "Weightless"  (2016)
 "Falling Down"  (2017)
 "Moonless Nights"  (2017)
 "Resurrected"  (2017)
 "Everywhere"  (2018)
 "Children of the Masai"  (2018)
"Underneath My Skin"  (2018)

Remixes
 2005 – Solar Stone – "Eastern Sea" (First State Remix) 
 2006 – Midway – "Cobra" (First State's First Aid Remix) 
 2007 – Tiësto – "Ten Seconds Before Sunrise" (First State Remix) 
 2008 – 4 Strings – "Catch A Fall" (First State Remix) 
 2008 – Tiësto – "Ten Seconds Before Sunrise" (First State's A Global Taste Remix) 
 2008 – Armin van Buuren – "Unforgivable" (First State Remix) 
 2009 – Bobina  – "Where Did You Go?" (First State Remix) 
 2009 – Vimana – "We Came" (First State Remix) 
 2009 – Ton TB – "Dream Machine" (First State Remix) 
 2009 – 3 Drives – "Greece 2000" (Sander van Dien Remix) 
 2009 – Jonas Steur  – "Cold Winds" (First State Remix) 
 2009 – Mac & Mac – "Solid Session" (First State Remix) 
 2009 – Filo & Peri – "Ashley" (First State Remix) 
 2009 – Dash Berlin  – "Waiting" (First State Remix) 
 2010 – Dash Berlin  – "Janeiro" (First State Remix) 
 2010 – Tiësto  – "Feel It In My Bones" (First State Remix) 
 2010 – George Acosta  – "Love Rain Down" (First State Remix) 
 2010 – Robbie Rivera  – "Departures" (First State Remix) 
 2011 – Blake Lewis – "Till We See The Sun" (First State Remix) 
 2011 – Jason van Wyk and Audien – "Someday" (First State Remix) 
 2011 – Jes – "It's Too Late" (First State Remix) 
 2013 - Paul Oakenfold & Disfunktion feat. Spitfire – Beautiful World 
 2016 – Armin van Buuren  – "Heading Up High" (First State Remix) 
 2017 - Tiësto  - "In The Dark" (First State Remix) 
 2020 - Mr Sam  - "Cygnes" (First State Remix)

References

External links
Official website

Club DJs
Dutch DJs
Dutch record producers
Dutch trance music groups
People from Dordrecht
Remixers
Progressive house musicians
Electronic dance music DJs